Athletics competitions at the 2010 Micronesian Games were held at the National Stadium in Koror, Palau, between August 3–6, 2010.

A total of 36 events were contested, 18 by men and 18 by women.

Medal summary
Medal winners and their results were published on the Oceania Athletics Association and on the Games' athletics webpage.

Men

Women

Medal table (unofficial)

References

External links
 Athletics at the 2010 Micronesian Games

Athletics at the Micronesian Games
Athletics in Palau
Micronesian Games
Micronesian Games